John Mason School is a secondary school with Sixth Form in the town of Abingdon-on-Thames, Oxfordshire.

History
Established as a grammar school in 1960, Berkshire Education Committee named it John Mason School after sixteenth-century intellectual, diplomat and spy Sir John Mason, whose picture can be found hanging in the school hall. He was born in Abingdon and educated at the nearby Abingdon School. Coincidentally, the first Headteacher of John Mason School, Derrick Hurd, went on to become Head at Easthampstead Park School based on the estate of which Sir John Mason was the keeper in 1548.

Situated on Wootton Road, John Mason School is centrally located in a four-way partnership of Abingdon schools known as 14:19 Abingdon. The other members are Larkmead School, Fitzharrys School and Abingdon and Witney College. The four partners share Sixth Form lessons. John Mason has approximately 1000 students as of 2017.

Sarah Brinkley became the school's new headteacher in 2015. She has since become the Executive Headteacher of Abingdon Learning Trust, with Adrian Rees the headteacher as of 2020.

Specialist school and academy status
The three schools in the Consortium were granted Specialist School Status in 2004. John Mason focused on visual arts which meant it received greater funding from the government to provide specialist equipment. In 2006 JMS opened the 06 Gallery, a new construction reflecting the specialism and featuring much of the students' artwork.

Previously a community school administered by Oxfordshire County Council, John Mason School converted to academy status on 1 February 2014. However the school continues to co-ordinate with Oxfordshire County Council for admissions.

Houses
The school has three houses, Stert, Ock, and Thames, of the colours red, green and blue respectively. There was a fourth house, Isis, but this was dissolved in 1993. The houses are named after watercourses in the town of Abingdon.

Academic performance
According to the Department of Education 2011 breakdown of A-level results, John Mason were the sixth best in the UK for performance in mathematics, with 38% of students getting A* grade. In 2013, then-Education Secretary Michael Gove praised John Mason as "a school that, under a particularly inspirational head, is taking very very positive steps to provide students with a range of qualifications and the type of education that is relevant to the modern world."
In 2017 Ofsted reported its quality of teaching, learning and assessment, outcomes for pupils and overall effectiveness all required improvement; the second lowest grade.

The Welsh Farm
The school owns a farm, generally known as the Welsh Farm, at Troedyrhiwgellifawr near the village of Pumsaint and the town of Llandovery in Wales. Students commonly undertake a four-day bender and some have the option to revisit for a Geography Fieldwork trip or a Triple Science Observational Cosmology Trip in Year 12. The John Mason Association owns and runs the farm, which is visited by nearly all students.

Notable former staff and pupils
Paul Mayhew-Archer (a writer on The Vicar of Dibley and My Hero) was formerly a teacher at JMS.

Famous former pupils include the Premiership footballer Matthew Taylor, West End actor and singer Oliver Tompsett, BBC and Channel 5 news presenter Katie Ledger, folk musician John Spiers and Dr Mike Leahy, who presents his own TV programme Invasion of the Bodyscratchers and has appeared in many other medical programmes.

References

External links 
 
 The Welsh Farm
 Ofsted Inspection Report
 League Tables

Secondary schools in Oxfordshire
Educational institutions established in 1960
Abingdon-on-Thames
The Abingdon Consortium
1960 establishments in England
Academies in Oxfordshire